First Congregational and Presbyterian Society Church of Westport, now known as United Church of Christ of Wadhams, is a historic Congregational church on Main Street/CR 10 in Westport, Essex County, New York.  It was built in 1837 and is a vernacular, Federal style meeting house form building.  It is a one-story building with clapboard exterior siding and a simple gable roof.   It features a two tiered belfry with dome shaped roof above the west gable end.  The adjacent parish hall was formerly a dance hall and moved to this site in 1901.  It is a plain, two story rectangular structure with a gable roof and clapboard siding.

It was listed on the National Register of Historic Places in 1988.

References

External links
Wadhams-Westport NY United Church of Christ (UCC) website

United Church of Christ churches in New York (state)
Churches on the National Register of Historic Places in New York (state)
Federal architecture in New York (state)
Churches completed in 1837
19th-century United Church of Christ church buildings
Churches in Essex County, New York
National Register of Historic Places in Essex County, New York
1837 establishments in New York (state)